Libya competed at the 2013 Mediterranean Games in Mersin, Turkey from the 20th to 30 June 2013.

Cycling

Football

Men's tournament

Team

Sadam El Werfalli
Abdelaziz Bin Ali
Abdurahim Abdulkarem
Muftah Taktak
Almoatasembellah Musrati
Saleh Ali Nasr
Hamdou Elhouni
Abdel Gawad Hameida
Osama Al-Bedwi
Mohamed Elmangoush
Bashier Alkarami
Moftah Mohamed
Asnsi Ammar
Rabia Alshadi
Ayoub Adreis
Ahmed Salem
Firas Shelegh
Ahmed Abdalla Ramadan

Standings

Results

Swimming 

Men

References

Nations at the 2013 Mediterranean Games
2013
Mediterranean Games